The Beda Sultanate was a state in South Arabia.

History 
With the Ottoman withdrawal from Yemen in 1636 AD, Yemen became independent, but the southern provinces, which were known in the past as the East, separated from Yemen after the Turkish withdrawal and became fragmented into sultanates and provinces such as Yafa ', Al-Fadhli, Al-Rasas, Al-Wahdi, Al-Awlaki, Lahj, Al-Haythami, Al-Kathiri. In Al-Bayda (Saraw Madhaj), a number of the Saraw Mazhaj tribes around Hesi unanimously asserted their independence.

The Beda Sultans were at one point a very powerful factor in the region, but in their later years their influence waned.

From 1905 to 1912, the Beda Sultan attempted to obtain a protectorate treaty with Britain, but the negotiations proved fruitless. In September 1914, it was reported that the Beda Sultan refused to enter into a treaty unless Britain would promise to pay a stipend, give 100 rifles with ammunition, 2 cannons, and gunpowder.

On 2 February 1915, during World War I, the Ottoman Empire invaded the Beda Sultanate. The Haushabi sent a large force in support of the Beda Sultan. By the 13th, the Beda had routed the Ottomans and captured their tents and ammunition. Sometime before the 20th, the Ottomans returned and raided Beda's outlying villages, before being chased away by a Bedan force of 1,000 troops, suffering 10 killed and many wounded, as well as losing 3 camels filled with ammunition, shells and tents. The Beda Sultan expected that the Ottomans would invade again and declared to Britain his intention to defend his country to the last. On his request, Britain sent him ammunition.

On 21 March 1916, Zaidi forces loyal to the Ottoman Empire launched another offensive into the Beda Sultanate, intending to use Beda as a springboard for further offensives onto Shihr and Mukalla. Recognizing the threat posed, Britain sent 200 rifles and 30,000 rounds of ammunition to the Beda Sultan in support. The attack ultimately failed.

British documents from the 1920s and 1930s continue to mention an independent Beda Sultanate.

In 1930, the Mutawakkilite Kingdom of Yemen conquered the Beda sultanate.

Sultans 
 Ali Bin Adballah reigned from before 1909 to after 1911. He unsuccessfully attempted to obtain a protection treaty with Britain.
 Abdallah bin Alawi bin Husein was the sultan as of 1916. A British report dated 28 January 1916 said he had been newly elected and described him as a "stout warrior".

Geography 
Beda bordered the Audhali to the south, Beihan to the north, Upper Yafa to the west, and the Aulaqi to the southeast.

The terrain of Beda was an elevated plateau sloping gradually to the low-lying Beihan to the north. The soil was sandy and fertile.

Tribes 
The Beda Sultanate was a confederacy of 10 tribes, of which the Humekani and Azzani were the most influential.

 Azzani
 Homaikani
 Dubani
 Madafai
 Mash'ari
 Al-'Umar
 Hashami
 Dafari
 Hayashi
 Maljami

References 

Former countries in Western Asia
States and territories established in 1636
States and territories disestablished in 1930
South Arabia
Former sultanates